This is a list of composers from Sri Lanka.

A 
W. D. Amaradeva

B 
Mohideen Baig

D 
Lakshman Joseph de Saram

E 
Tanya Ekanayaka

F 
C. T. Fernando

G 
Dilup Gabadamudalige
Mohammed Gauss
Rookantha Gunathilake
Nadeeka Guruge

I 
Iraj Weeraratne

J 
Edward Jayakody
Marcelline Jayakody
Clarence Jey

K 
Kasun Kalhara
Gunadasa Kapuge
Premasiri Khemadasa
Gayathri Khemadasa

M 
Nimal Mendis

P 
Stanley Peiris

R 
Lionel Ranwala

S 
Ananda Samarakoon
Sunil Santha
Dinesh Subasinghe
Priya Suriyasena

T 
Tariq Hisny

W 
Rohana Weerasinghe
Clarence Wijewardane

References

Sri Lankan

Composers